The former Diocese of Ribe was a Roman Catholic diocese in Southern Jutland, Denmark. The diocese was established in 948, and dissolved in 1536 during the Protestant Reformation. Within the newly established protestant Church of Denmark, the Diocese of Ribe effectively replaced its Roman Catholic precursor.

The diocese contained 29 deaneries and 278 parishes. Its bishop also oversaw a number of monasteries and friaries, in addition to a hospital.

History 
In 948, Leofdag was ordained as the first Bishop of Ribe by Archbishop Adaldag. Leofdag is said to have been martyred by pagans and is regarded as a local saint, though he was never canonized. Ribe Cathedral, which served as the central cathedral of the diocese, contains a shrine dedicated to him. Until the death of his third known successor, Val, the bishops of Ribe, Schleswig, and Aarhus primarily worked to convert locals to their faith and traveled around Jutland on missionary tours. 

In 1060, the region north of the Kongeå in Jutland was divided into the four dioceses of Ribe, Aarhus, Viborg and Vestervig. The diocese was a suffragan of the Archdiocese of Hamburg-Bremen until 1104, when the newly formed Archdiocese of Lund became its metropolitan. 

Although Ivar Munk was selected to take the position of bishop in 1499, he was not ordained until 1513. During his term, the church was pressured by the Protestant Reformation. He lost authority over some of his diocese in Northern Schleswig following their adoption of protestantism, though he maintained authority over the remainder of the diocese. 

Ivar Munk opposed the selection of Christian III of Denmark as king in 1533, yet was forced to act as a privy councillor to the monarch's party for Jutland. As a result, he resigned from his position as bishop. Ivar Munk was succeeded by his nephew, Olaf Munk in 1534. As a result of the reformation, Olaf Munk was imprisoned on 12 August 1536, like all other catholic bishops in Denmark. He was later released on the conditions that he conform to the Church of Denmark and marry.

Structure 
The first church built within the diocese was founded by Ansgar ca. 855. It was initially overseen by his successor: Saint Rembert. The church was destroyed following Rembert's death in 888, though it was rebuilt circa 948. Following the completion of Ribe Cathedral in the 12th century, it served as the central cathedral of the diocese. The city of Ribe was also home to St. Nicholas' Priory, a Franciscan friary, St. Catherine's Priory, a hospital of the Holy Ghost, and a commandery of the Knights of St. John of Jerusalem. The diocese also oversaw the Cistercian monasteries of Tvis Abbey, Løgum Abbey, and Seem Abbey, which had been Benedictine until 1171. There were Benedictine convents at Gudum Priory and Stubber Priory, in addition to a Dominican priory in Vejle and a Franciscan friary in Kolding.

The diocese comprised 29 deaneries and a total of 278 parishes. The bishop's cathedral chapter included four prelates, 21 prebendaries, eight minor canons, and approximately 50 chaplains.

Bishops 

948–9?? Leofdag
988–1000 Folkbert/Folcbertus
1000–1043 Odinkar the Younger
1043–1060 Val
1060–1085 Odder
1085–1122 Gerold/Jareld
1122–1134 Thore/Thure
1134–11?? Nothold
11??–1142 Asger
1142–1162 Elias
1162–1170 Radulf
1171–1177 Stephan
1178–1204 Omer
1204–1214 Oluf
1214–1230 Tuve
1230–1246 Gunner
1246–1273 Esger
1273–1288 Tyge
1288–1313 Christian
1313–1327 Jens Hee
1327–1345 Jakob Splitaf
1345–1364 Peder Thuresen
1365–1369 Mogens Jensen
1369–1388 Jens Mikkelsen
1389–1409 Eskil
1409–1418 Peder Lykke
1418–1454 Christiern Hemmingsen
1454–1465 Henrik Stangenberg
1465–1483 Peder Nielsen Lodehat
1483–1498 Hartvig Juel
1499–1534 Ivar Munk
1534–1536 Olaf Munk

References 

Former Catholic dioceses in Denmark
Catholic Church in Denmark
Dioceses established in the 10th century
Diocese Of Ribe, Ancient
948 establishments
10th-century establishments in Denmark